Dromberg is a surname. Notable people with the surname include:

 Donnar Dromberg (1908–1992), Finnish philatelist
 Kaarina Dromberg (born 1942), Finnish politician

See also
 Bromberg (surname)